Envy & Other Sins was a four-piece band from Birmingham, England, who came to fame by winning Channel 4's nationwide talent show, mobileAct unsigned. They were the winners of the show, on which they won a £60,000 record contract with A&M Records. The contract allowed them to release one album and two singles. Their first single, "Highness", was released on 3 March 2008, and their debut album, We Leave at Dawn, was released on 31 March 2008.

On 1 July 2009, the band announced they were to split up, with Jim Macaulay becoming the drummer for Eliot Sumner, Emmy the Great and The Stranglers during the next decade.

Musical style 
Writing about the band in November 2006, British music magazine NME described their songs as "catchy in the extreme, with sweet harmonies, wicked hooks and choruses a-go-go".

Discography

Albums

Singles

Demo songs 
 "Man Bites God"
 "Step Across"
 "Talk to Strangers"
 "Tomorrow"
 "(It Gets Harder to Be a) Martyr"
 "Words Fail"
 "Almost Certainly Elsewhere"
 "The Company We Keep"

See also 
List of songs recorded by Envy & Other Sins
The Stranglers (Jim Macaulay is now the drummer)

References

External links 
 
 Official Bebo

English rock music groups